Cannon Mines is an unincorporated community in Washington County, in the U.S. state of Missouri.

History
A post office called Cannon Mines was established in 1915, and remained in operation until 1940. The community most likely was named after the proprietor of a local lead mine.

References

Unincorporated communities in Washington County, Missouri
Unincorporated communities in Missouri